East Shillong is one of the 60 Legislative Assembly constituencies of Meghalaya state in India. It is part of East Khasi Hills district and is reserved for candidates belonging to the Scheduled Tribes. It falls under Shillong Lok Sabha constituency and its current MLA is Ampareen Lyngdoh of National People's Party.

Member of Legislative Assembly

Election results

2018

See also
List of constituencies of the Meghalaya Legislative Assembly
Shillong (Lok Sabha constituency)
East Khasi Hills district

References

Assembly constituencies of Meghalaya
East Khasi Hills district